A voussoir is a wedge-shaped element, typically a stone, which is used in building an arch or vault.

Although each unit in an arch or vault is a voussoir, two units are of distinct functional importance: the keystone and the springer.  The keystone is the centre stone or masonry unit at the apex of an arch.  The springer is the lowest voussoir on each side, located where the curve of the arch springs from the vertical support or abutment of the wall or pier.

The keystone is often decorated or enlarged.  An enlarged and sometimes slightly dropped keystone is often found in Mannerist arches of the 16th century, beginning with the works of Giulio Romano, who also began the fashion for using voussoirs above rectangular openings, rather than a lintel (Palazzo Stati Maccarani, Rome, circa 1522).

The word is a stonemason's term borrowed in Middle English from French verbs connoting a "turn" (OED).  Each wedge-shaped voussoir turns aside the thrust of the mass above, transferring it from stone to stone to the springer's bottom face (impost), which is horizontal and passes the thrust on to the supports.  Voussoir arches distribute weight efficiently, and take maximum advantage of the compressive strength of stone, as in an arch bridge. The outer boundary of a voussoir is an extrados.

In Visigothic and Moorish architectural traditions, the voussoirs are often in alternating colours (ablaq), usually red and white. This is also found sometimes in Romanesque architecture.

During the 18th and 19th centuries, British bricklayers became aware that, by thickening the vertical mortar joint between regularly shaped bricks from bottom to top, they could construct an elliptical arch of useful strength over either a standard "former", or over specially constructed timber falsework (temporary structure to be removed once the construction is complete).  The bricks used in such an arch are often referred to as "voussoirs".

See also
Glossary of architecture

References

External links

Photo repertory of voussoirs — at www.OntarioArchitecture.com

Arches and vaults
Masonry
Ornaments (architecture)
Architectural elements
Architectural history
Moorish architecture
Islamic architectural elements